Against Me!, the self-titled 12" EP by punk band Against Me! was their first EP release. It was released twice as an EP. There were originally 500 copies printed. However, due to a mastering defect or "recording error" on the vinyl, only 145 copies were originally released to the public, 50 of which were sold at the record release party. Thus, actual copies of the record are extremely rare, though the tracks are widely circulated on the internet. The remaining 355 copies were eventually released through personal sales by the band.

Track listing

Personnel
 Laura Jane Grace – guitar, vocals, harmonica on "I Am Citizen"
 Kevin Mahon – drums, percussion

References

External links
 Against Me!

Against Me! EPs
Punk rock EPs
Folk EPs
2000 EPs